Girl with a Pearl Earring is a 2008 play.  Adapted by David Joss Buckley from the 1999 novel of the same title by Tracy Chevalier, it premiered at the Cambridge Arts Theatre.  It then received its London premiere at the Theatre Royal Haymarket on 29 September 2008, directed by Joe Dowling and designed by Peter Mumford.  Its London run had been scheduled to end on 1 November, but after largely poor reviews and in a poor financial climate it closed early on 18 October.

London cast
Niall Buggy - Van Ruijven
Adrian Dunbar - Johannes Vermeer
Jonathan Bailey - Pieter
Kimberley Nixon - Griet 
Sara Kestelman - Maria Thins
Flora Spencer-Longhurst - Cornelia Vermeer

See also
Girl with a Pearl Earring, c. 1665 Vermeer painting

Notes

External links
Theatre's brush with painting - Guardian, 1 October 2008

2008 plays
Plays based on novels
Plays based on real people
American plays
Cultural depictions of Johannes Vermeer